Song Tao may refer to:

 Song Tao (diplomat) (born 1955), Chinese diplomat and politician
 Song Tao (basketball) (born 1965), Chinese basketball player
 Song Tao (footballer) (born 1982), Chinese football player
 Songthaew Type of transportation common in Asia